The immunome is the set of genes and proteins that constitute the immune system, excluding those that are widespread in other cell types, and not involved in the immune response itself.  It is further defined as the set of peptides derived from the proteome that interact with the immune system. There are numerous ongoing efforts to characterize and sequence the immunomes of humans, mice, and elements of non-human primates. Typically, immunomes are studied using immunofluorescence microscopy to determine the presence and activity of immune-related enzymes and pathways.
Practical applications for studying the immunome include vaccines, therapeutic proteins, and further treatment of other diseases. The study of the immunome falls under the field of immunomics.

Etymology
The word immunome is a portmanteau of the words "immune" and "chromosome." See omics for a further discussion.

Efforts to characterize
The exact size of the human immunome is currently unknown and has been a topic of study for decades. However, the amount of information it encodes is said to exceed the size of the human genome by several orders of magnitude due to, at least in part, somatic hypermutation and junctional diversity. There are several ongoing efforts to characterize the immunomes of humans and other species.

One major effort, launched in 2016, is a collaborative project between The Human Vaccines Project, Vanderbilt University Medical Center, and Illumina, Inc. This project is entitled the Human Immunome Program and its goal is to decipher the complete collection of B and T immune cell receptors from the human population. Thousands of individuals will need to be studied in order to meet this goal, and they will need to represent different ages, genders, ethnicities, and geographical origins. Furthermore, people with diseases and people who have undergone vaccination will need to be studied as well. The results of the program will be shared as an open-sourced database. The sequencing project will continue until no new unique sequences occur within the B and T cell receptors and is expected to take ten years.

Similarly, there is a research project called the Immunological Genome Project whose stated goal is to generate "a complete microarray dissection of gene expression and its regulation in the immune system of the mouse". In other words, the project is trying to define and characterize the immunome of the mouse. This project is primarily intended to function as a primary resource and the researchers actively accept suggestions from the community. The project team consists of more than 20 research labs, all working on various aspects of the project, including studying T cells, B cells, and dendritic cells, along with many other types of cells within the mouse immunome. The project has been ongoing since 2008.

Efforts are also being made to characterize aspects of non-human immunomes, particularly non-human primates because of their genetic similarity to humans.

Methods of study
In order to gain useful knowledge about the immunome and its characteristics, the cells and components of the immune system must be phenotyped in a quick and pragmatic manner. There are hundreds of known cell types within the immune system and the possibility of detecting and characterizing them without the use of recent advances in immunophenotyping technology was remote because large amounts of an individual's blood would have been required. This outdated method is called low-dimensional immunophenotyping. However, high-dimensional immunophenotyping is now a possibility. The types of high-dimensional immunophenotyping can be broadly grouped into two categories: the use of isotopes of lanthanide and the use of fluorophores. These advanced technologies allow for up to 100 parameters to be measured at one time.

Applications
There are potentially far-reaching applications for studying the immunome. Dr. Anne De Groot believes that knowledge gained from the immunome could lead to discovering differences in the absolute number of T cell epitopes, and could reveal antigenic relationships between different but immunologically similar pathogens. She further states that there are possibilities for autoimmune disease therapies and organ transplantation.

Immunome investigation has proven useful in determining the symptoms and potential causes of pulmonary fibrosis on a molecular level.

The development of vaccines is also an application of immunome study as shown by Carlos F. Suárez and his colleagues. They were able to find components of a malaria vaccine that could be readily used in humans as a result of having characterized the cell surface receptor of an immune cell from an owl monkey. These monkeys have been shown to be highly susceptible to human malaria, so they serve as a good model for the disease. It could also be possible to develop an influenza vaccine that would provide protection from several strains of the virus.

Furthermore, analyzation of the immunomes of non-human primates and other species can reflect the evolutionary history of species as shown by David F. Plaza and his colleagues. This immunome data can also be helpful when testing antibody therapies on non-human primates to ensure they are safe for humans. This can be accomplished by being able to interpret results in the context of the slight differences in ortholog structure between the human and non-human primate immunomes.

Databases
There are a number of databases corresponding to the different facets of the human immunome and the immunomes of other species.

Immunome Knowledge Base (IKB)
An effort is being made to assemble immunological information into a singular database called the Immunome Knowledge Base(IKB). The two scientists behind the effort, Csaba Ortutay & Mauno Vihinen, have integrated data from three separate databases into IKB. These three databases, Immunome, ImmTree, and ImmunomeBase, all have separate, but related information pertaining to the immunome. Immunome contains entries to official gene names according to the HUGO Gene Nomenclature Committee, alternative names, and locations of genes on the chromosomes. ImmTree contains entries related to the molecular evolution of the immune system, including orthologous genes and phylogenetic trees. Finally, ImmunomeBase is a multi-species database related to immunity. Altogether, as of 2009, IKB has entries for more than 100,000 data items, including 893 entries for genes in the immunome.

Immune Epitope Database (IEDB)
This database serves as a resource for data on antibody and T cell epitopes studied in humans, non-human primates, and other species as it relates to disease, allergies, autoimmunity, and transplantation. The database also has tools to assist in the prediction and analysis of epitopes.

Immunome Database for Marsupials and Monotremes (IDMM)
This database has data for every known marsupial and monotreme immune gene. It serves as a resource for immunologists and researchers studying the evolution of mammalian immunity.

Immunology Database and Analysis Portal (ImmPort)
A database developed for the purpose of promoting the re-use of immunological data. It is a partnership between researchers at the University of California-San Francisco, Stanford University, the University of Buffalo, the Technion - Israel Institute of Technology, and Northrop Grumman. It encompasses results from over 400 studies related to immunology.

Immunological Genome Project (ImmGen)
This database is a public resource containing the data relating to the study of the immune system of the mouse.

Other databases
 Reference Database of Immune Cells (RefDIC)
 Innate Immune Database (IIDB)
 Immunogenetic Related Information Source (IRIS)
 DC ATLAS

References

Systems biology